The Solarium Augusti (also called Horologium Augusti) was an ancient Roman monument in the Campus Martius constructed during the reign of Augustus. It functioned as a giant solar marker, according to various interpretations serving either as a simple meridian line or as a sundial. The obelisk belonged to Egyptian Pharaoh Psamtik II.

History
It was erected by the emperor Augustus, with the 30-meter Egyptian red granite Obelisk of Montecitorio, that he had brought from Heliopolis in ancient Egypt.  The obelisk was employed as a gnomon that cast its shadow on a marble pavement inlaid with a gilded bronze network of lines, by which it was possible to read the time of day according to the season of the year. The solarium was dedicated to the Sun in 10 BCE, 35 years after Julius Caesar's calendar reform. It was the first solar dedication in Rome.

Campus Martius
The Solarium Augusti was integrated with the Ara Pacis in the Campus Martius, aligning with Via Flaminia, in such a way that the shadow of the gnomon fell across the center of the marble altar on 23 September, the birthday of Augustus himself. The obelisk itself was set up to memorialize Augustus' subordination of Egypt to the control of the Roman empire. The two monuments must have been planned together, in relation to the pre-existing Mausoleum of Augustus, to demonstrate that Augustus was "born to bring peace", that peace was his destiny. According to the Cambridge Ancient History, "the collective message dramatically linked peace with military authority and imperial expansion."

Pliny the Elder remarked that in the course of time it had become incorrect, and offered several explanations for the shift. The obelisk was illustrated, supported by a reclining figure, on the base  of the Column of Antoninus Pius.

The obelisk gnomon was still standing in the 8th century CE, but was thrown down and broken, then covered in sediment; it was rediscovered in 1512, but not excavated. In a triumphant rededication, the 'Montecitorio obelisk' was re-erected in Piazza di Montecitorio by Pius VI in 1789.

Archaeology
Edmund Buchner excavated some sections of the calibrated marble pavement of the Solarium Augusti under the block of houses between Piazza del Parlamento and Piazza San Lorenzo in Lucina.  Recent studies have challenged Buchner's reconstruction of the Solarium as a full sundial, maintaining that the archaeological and textual evidence indicates a simple meridian line, marking the changing noontime position of the Sun in the course of the year.

See also
Obelisks of Rome

Notes

References
The broad context of the Augustan iconographic program, of which the Solarium Augusti is part, is presented in The Power of Images in the Age of Augustus  by Paul Zanker; University of Michigan Press; 1988.

External links

Paul Zanker, "The Augustan Program of Cultural Renewal (part two). The Solarium Augusti in the context of Augustan monuments.
Project to construct a full-scale replica on the campus of the University of Oregon, Eugene
"The Horologium of Augustus: a bibliography"
Horologium of Augustus, part of the Encyclopædia Romana by James Grout
 Meridian vs. Horologium-Solarium

Sundials
Ancient Roman buildings and structures in Rome
Augustan building projects
Buildings and structures completed in the 1st century BC
Rome R. IV Campo Marzio
Campus Martius